Wu-Tang Meets the Indie Culture is an album released October 18, 2005. This album was put together by Dreddy Krueger who has produced Wu-Tang and others. It includes collaborated tracks by Wu-Tang Clan members, Wu-Tang Clan affiliates, and various other underground hip-hop artists such as Cannibal Ox, Aesop Rock, Sean Price, Casual, and MF DOOM. The album has sold 59,133 units.

Track listing

References

Hip hop compilation albums
2005 compilation albums
Wu-Tang Clan albums
Babygrande Records compilation albums
Albums produced by Bronze Nazareth